The 1973–74 Montana Grizzlies basketball team represented the University of Montana during the 1973–74 NCAA Division I men's basketball season. Charter members of the Big Sky Conference, the Grizzlies were led by third-year head coach Jud Heathcote and played their home games on campus at Dahlberg Arena in Missoula, Montana. They finished the regular season at 19–7, with a 11–3 conference record, tied for the regular season title with  the Bengals won the one-game playoff in Missoula by 

The Big Sky conference tournament debuted two years later, in 1976.

Junior center Ken McKenzie was a unanimous selection to the all-conference team; senior guard Robin Selvig and junior 
swingman Eric Hays were on the second team.

Postseason results

|-
!colspan=9 style=| Big Sky Playoff

References

External links
Sports Reference – Montana Grizzlies: 1973–74 basketball season

Montana Grizzlies basketball seasons
Montana
Montana Grizzlies basketball
Montana Grizzlies basketball